The Imran Series (Urdu عمران سیریز) is an Urdu spy novel series created by Pakistani writer Ibn-e-Safi. Ali Imran is the pivotal character, a comical secret agent who controls the Secret Service as X-2 but appears to work as a normal member of the Secret Service. Except for a handful of people, no one knows his status as the chief of the Service.

The first book, Khaufnaak Imarat (The Terrifying Building), was published in October 1955. In early books Imran appears as a solo detective, but later in the ninth book, Dhuaen ki Tehreer (The Scribbling in Smoke), he is portrayed as the chief of Secret Service as X-2.

Humour is the essence of Ibn-e-Safi books. In this series by Mr. Safi had written a total of 120 books.

Although Ibn-e-Safi is the creator of Imran Series, the Series rose to fame and popularity due to the work of Mazhar Kaleem who incorporated new elements into it and wrote more than 600 novels.

Overview
Following the footsteps of the first best-selling series, Jasoosi Dunya, this series features Ali Imran – a playful, yet deceiving personality. He is a bright young Oxford graduate with MSc and PhD degrees in chemistry. His comical and apparently incompetent persona hides his identity as head of a secret service. This series has been widely acclaimed for its high literary quality and strong character development.

Imran Series explains the workings of a country's Secret service that operates from the capital of the country (supposed by many to be Karachi in Pakistan which was the capital when initial Imran Series novels were written. Although Ibn-e-Safi was careful to never explicitly state this, villains often refer to the country as the "one from South Asia"). The Secret Service is administered by the Secretary of Internal Affairs, Sir Sultan, who offers Imran the position as its head after getting personal help from him in Raat ka Shahzadah (The Prince of Night – #8).

Ali Imran

Ali Imran is a pivotal character in Imran Series. Handsome and bright, the young-man holds MSc, and PhD degrees from Oxford University and has extraordinary sex appeal. He always appears comical and moronic, using these features to camouflage himself as one of the stupidest men. Always shown acting stupid, insane, and funny, he keeps the readers in hysterics at his every action. He never reveals his true side to anyone. He usually dresses eccentrically; for example, a pink coat, a light green shirt, a yellow necktie, white pants, and a purple flat hat with a red rose in it is his typical apparel. Ibne Safi refers to this as Imran's "Technicolor Outfit."

Imran is son of Amma Bi and Mr. Abdul-ur-Rahman, Director General of Central Intelligence Bureau and as being from Genghis Khan's bloodline, he has Mongol lineage. He resides in an apartment with his two most trusted assistants: Sulaiman, the cook, and Joseph Mugunda, his bodyguard. He is, most of the time, seen driving a two-seater sports car.

Imran purposefully keeps multi facets to his personality. As Imran—Ali Imran—he acts as an opportunist who can turn either a police informer or a blackmailer as the situation demands. A perfect cover to his profession.  His other most significant personality facet is the Chief of the Secret Services: X-2. Only three other characters know his secret: Sir Sultan, Secretary of the Ministry of Internal Affairs; “Black Zero,” or Tahir, who acts as X-2 in Imran’s absence; and Roshi, a long time friend and a trusted partner. The other two personalities Imran assumes now and then are the Prince of Dhump, a warlord of a fictitious state known as Dhump, and Rana Tahavvar Ali Sandooqui, a wealthy landlord and businessman.

Imran works as a normal member of the Secret Service and none of the other members had a slightest clue of his being their chief officer. These agents usually laugh him off and sneer at him, but as X-2, they really dread him. Imran's favourite agent is Safder Saeed. 
Imran has perfected the art of dodging bullets. It is called "Sing Art," which he learns from an international Chinese criminal, Sing Hee. Imran calls him Uncle Sing (Chacha Sing) and in return, Sing Hee refers him as nephew. His another old time foe is T3B, Theresia Bumble-Bee of Bohemia. Theresia has a great crush on him but Imran hardly pay heed to her rather jeer at her sentiments.

He, like Col. Ahmad Kamal Faridi, has impregnable character vis-à-vis women. Due to his naive appearance and innocent looks, women are smitten with him, but he usually gives them a cold shoulder.

Other characters

One of Ibn-e-Safi's distinguished writing qualities include formation and development of characters. He has established characters in such a fashion that they appear to be real and materialised. And, Imran Series has a range of diverse, colourful, and sentient characters.

X-2, the chief of the secret service, in fact is Ali Imran (sometimes played by Tahir aka Black Zero). The members of the X-2's team are: Juliana Fitzwater, Safdar Saeed, Tanveer Ashraf, Khawar, Chauhan, Nomani, Siddeeque, Zafar ul Mulk, Jameson, and Nimi.  Sir Sultan, Secretary of the Ministry of foreign affairs,

is Imran or X-2's boss. Roshni, an Anglo-Burmese girl, is Imran's long time friend; she was Imran's working partner for sometime, but later left him.

Captain Fayyaz is the Superintendent of the Central Intelligence Bureau. Not very sharp or intelligent, he with the help of Imran is able to solve numerous cases, which resulted in his promotions.

Imran resides in a flat with his cook, Sulaiman, Sulaiman's wife, Gul-Rukh and the Central African bodyguard, Joseph Mugunda.

Imran's family includes his father Karam Rahman (also mentioned as Abdul Rahman in initial books), Director General of Central Intelligence Bureau, mother Amma Bi, and sister Suraiya. Suraiya marries Dr. Shahid in the books, Adha Teetar and Adha Batair.

In series written by Ibn-E-Safi, One of a biggest foe of Imran was Tsung Hi, a chinese criminal who on certain occasions favored Imran by not killing him or harming him and vice versa. He was described as a tall, very thin man with glowing eyes full of energy. Imran considered him one of his worthy adversary and vice versa. Tsung Hi was a master in martial art as well as a very intelligent individual. He knew a very lesser known art of deceiving bullets from a very close range which Imran was able to learn from him in their first encounter in London during his study in Oxford. He joyfully calls Imran Bhatija (son of one's brother) meaning nephew in return to which Imran used to call him chacha meaning uncle.

Headquarters of the Secret Service
Daanish Manzil was the initial headquarters of the Secret Services. It, however, was exposed thus destroyed in one of the adventures (see Sugarbank trilogy) and the Secret Services was forced to shift its headquarters to a new building called "Psycho Mansion," which operates under the semblance of a psychiatric clinic. Till Safi's last book "Psycho Mansion" maintains its status of being the headquarters. The members of the Secret Service, from time to time, also use another building, the mansion of "Rana Palace," as a hideout and operations centre.

Plagiarism
During 1960–1963, while Ibn-e-Safi was suffering from schizophrenia, many amateur writers started posing themselves as Ibn-e-Safi and produced third class copies of his work, distorting the character of not only Ali Imran, but also of Colonel Faridi and Captain Hameed. These acts of vandalism were reported by Ibn-e-Safi himself in the preface of Daidh Matwaalay (One and a Half Amused – #42), the book he returned with after his recovery. Some writers and publishers still continue to write on Safi's characters, much to the annoyance of many fans. Safi used to mention fans' complaints sometimes in the prefaces, and mocked the fake publishers and writers in his own witty style.

After the death of Ibn-e-Safi, H Iqbal, MA Rahat, S Qureshi, Mazhar Kaleem writes books in the series, and has introduced many new characters in the series. MA Rahat died on 24 April 2017. Ibn-e-Kaleem died on 12 March 2017. Mazhar Kaleem  also died on 26 May 2018. Some fans of Ibn-e-Safi dismiss Kaleem's books, arguing that Kaleem distorted the original 'feel' of the series, and that he deformed the key characteristics of many characters, including Ali Imran. Nevertheless, his books have a significant readership.

The writers who continued writing their own versions of Imran Series (specially after the death of Mr. Safi) included H Iqbal, S Qureshi, MA Rahat, Ibn-e-Rahat, Mushtaq Ahmed Qureshi, Ayne Safi, MA Sajid, Ibn-e-Kaleem, Azhar Kaleem, MA Peerzada, S Qureshi, N Safi, Nasir Javed, Mazhar Kaleem, Safdar Shaheen, Zaheer Ahmed (Author), Jahanzeb Aziz, Ali Nawazish, Irshad Alaser Jaferi, Syed Ali Hassan Gillani etc.

See also

 Ali Imran
 Family of Ali Imran
 Imran series characters
 List of Imran Series by Ibn-e-Safi
 Imran Series (Mazhar Kaleem)

References

Ibn-e-Safi
Imran Series
Spy novel series
Urdu-language fiction
Pakistani spy novels
Detective fiction